Yoel, Israel & Pashkavils is a 2006 Israeli documentary film on the Haredi Jews in Israel who have replaced popular media outlets such as television with the pashkvil or protest poster. The film follows Yoel Krause, a member of the Naturei Karta Haredi sect, who collects these posters. The documentary was directed by filmmaker Lina Chaplin.

The film won an award at the Warsaw Film Festival.

See also 
 Nayes - an Israeli television documentary series on the Haredi Israeli press

References 

Films about Orthodox and Hasidic Jews
2006 documentary films
Israeli documentary films
2006 films